This is a list of encyclopedic people associated with the University of Cincinnati in the United States of America.

Notable alumni
Those listed include graduates of the University, as well as attendees.
David Applebaum, Israeli physician
Frank P. Austin, celebrity interior designer
Jeff Austin, musician, Yonder Mountain String Band
Juan N. Babauta, graduate, governor of United States Commonwealth of Northern Mariana Islands
Judith Baker, judoka
Theda Bara, silent-film actress
Shari Barkin, pediatrician 
John Bardo, educator, President of Wichita State University, Chancellor of Western Carolina University.
John Barrett, graduate, CEO and President of Western & Southern Financial Group
Rachel Barton Butler, playwright
Kathleen Battle, graduate, Grammy Award-winning singer of New York Metropolitan Opera
Shoshana Bean, musical theater graduate, Broadway actress
Stanley Rossiter Benedict, inventor of Benedict's reagent
Thomas Berger, A&S graduate, author of Little Big Man
Matt Berninger, lead vocalist and founder of band The National
Theodore Berry, graduate, Mayor of Cincinnati 1972-76; member of Alpha Phi Alpha fraternity
Michael Bierut, DAAP graduate, partner at Pentagram New York
John Shaw Billings, M.D. 1860, began process to organize world's medical literature, now PubMed
Eula Bingham, occupational health scientist
Lee Bowman, graduate, actor in films such as Love Affair, Cover Girl and Bataan
Barnett R. Brickner, rabbi
Frank Brogan, Chancellor of State University System of Florida; former President of Florida Atlantic University
Henry T. Brown, chemical engineer; first African American to earn a BS degree in chemical engineering at the University of Cincinnati
Robert Burck, "naked cowboy" of Times Square in New York City; NYC mayoral candidate
Liz Callaway, singer and actress 
David Canary, A&S graduate, multiple Emmy-winning actor on All My Children since 1983
Salmon P. Chase, 23rd Governor of Ohio, U.S. Treasury Secretary 1861-64, Chief Justice 1864-73
Robin T. Cotton, ENT specialist and professor
Dennis Courtney, aka Denis Beaulne, Broadway actor (Peter Pan, Starlight Express, director, choreographer
Chase Crawford, actor and producer
E. Jocob Crull, Montana politician and colonel, rival of Jennette Rankin (first female member of U.S. Congress)
Cherien Dabis, filmmaker, screenwriter,  The L Word, Amreeka
David Daniels, singer
Charles G. Dawes, law graduate, 30th Vice President of the United States, winner of Nobel Peace Prize
Scott Devendorf, bass guitarist, founder of band The National
Jonathan Dever, former member of Ohio House of Representatives
Vinod Dham, graduate, "father" of Pentium computer chip (MS Eng, 77)
John Price Durbin, Chaplain of the Senate, president of Dickinson College
Jennifer Eberhardt, social psychologist, MacArthur Fellow
Randy Edelman, music graduate, composer of movie scores, received BMI’s Outstanding Career Achievement Award
Margaret Elizabeth Egan, librarian and communication scholar
Suzanne Farrell, prima ballerina, recipient of Kennedy Center Honors and Presidential Medal of Freedom
Hattie V. Feger, professor of education at Clark Atlanta University, 1931-1944
Abraham J. Feldman (1893–1977), rabbi
Mark "Markiplier" Fischbach, YouTube personality/media star
Stephen Flaherty, music graduate, Tony-winning composer (Ragtime, Once on This Island)
Frederick W. Franz, Jehovah's Witness, president of Watchtower Society
Paul Gilger, architecture graduate, architect, conceived Jerry Herman musical revue Showtune, designed Industrial Light & Magic film studio for George Lucas
Samuel H. Goldenson, rabbi
Leon Goldman, pioneer in laser medicine
Alexander D. Goode, one of Four Chaplains
Michael Graves, architecture graduate, architect
Moses J. Gries, rabbi
Louis Grossmann, rabbi
Michael Gruber, stage actor, singer, and dancer
Beth Gylys, poet and professor
Victor H. Haas, 1st Director of NIAID
Albert Hague, music graduate, composer of score for How the Grinch Stole Christmas, won nine Tony Awards for Redhead in 1959
Victor W. Hall, U.S. Navy Rear Admiral
Hollis Hammonds, artist and academic
Earl Hamner, graduate, writer, creator of The Waltons
Walt Handelsman, A&S graduate, Pulitzer Prize-winning political cartoonist
Dorian Harewood, drama graduate, film and television actor, voice artist
Randy Harrison, drama graduate, actor, Queer as Folk
Mary Hecht, BA 1952, American-born Canadian sculptor
James G. Heller, rabbi and composer
Maximilian Heller, rabbi
Bob Herbold, former Microsoft COO
Louise McCarren Herring, engineering graduate, pioneer of non-profit cooperative credit union movement
Al Hirt, trumpeter and bandleader
Ronald Howes, inventor of Easy-Bake Oven
Sarah Hutchings, composer
Bruce Edwards Ivins, microbiologist; key suspect in 2001 anthrax terror attacks, leaving five people dead
Ali Jarbawi, Palestinian politician and academic
James Kaiser, electrical engineer who developed Kaiser window for digital signal processing, winner of IEEE Jack S. Kilby Signal Processing Medal
Jerry Kathman, President and CEO of LPK
Charles Keating, criminal (Keating Five scandal); virulent anti-pornography activist
Robert Kistner, gynecologist
Bradley M. Kuhn, M.S. 2001, software freedom activist
James Michael Lafferty, division CEO in Procter and Gamble, Coca-Cola, and British American Tobacco; current CEO of Fine Hygienic Holding. Olympic Track and Field Coach. 
Sean Lahman, historian and sports writer
Kenesaw Mountain Landis, federal judge and first Commissioner of Major League Baseball
William Lawrence, Congressman, first vice president of American Red Cross
Christopher W. Lentz, U.S. Air Force Brigadier General
Liang Sili, academician of Chinese Academy of Sciences
Emil W. Leipziger, rabbi
Abraham Lubin, hazzan
Charlie Luken, law graduate, politician and former Mayor of Cincinnati
 Judah Leon Magnes, rabbi, Chancellor/President of the Hebrew University of Jerusalem 1925-1948
Michael Malatin, entrepreneur in field of hospital valet parking
Beverly Malone, nurse and president of American Nurses Association
Steven L. Mandel, anesthesiologist
Jack Manning, actor, stage director, acting teacher
Marco Marsan, author
Kevin McCollum, graduate, Tony-winning Broadway producer (Rent, Avenue Q, The Drowsy Chaperone)
Guy McElroy (M.A. 1972), art historian and curator
Martin A. Meyer, rabbi
Gregory Mixon, (Ph.D. 1989), American historian
Julian Morgenstern, rabbi, Hebrew Union College professor and president
Lena Beatrice Morton, literary scholar
Pamela Myers, musical theater graduate, Tony-nominated stage and screen actor
Morris Newfield, rabbi
Sandra Novack, author
Michele Pawk, musical theater graduate, Tony-winning Broadway actress (Hollywood Arms, Cabaret)
Archimedes Plutonium, (B.A. as Ludwig Hansen, 1972), notable Usenet personality
Paul Polman, CEO of Unilever
Jennie Porter, first black person to receive a Ph.D. from the University of Cincinnati and became the first black female public school principal in Cincinnati
James B. Preston, neurophysiologist
Faith Prince, musical theater graduate, Tony-winning Broadway actress (Guys and Dolls)
Lee Roy Reams, musical theater graduate, Tony-nominated actor, dancer
Michael E. Reynolds, champion of the "earthship" sustainable construction movement
Dennis L. Riley (born 1945), politician in New Jersey General Assembly, represented 4th Legislative District 1980-90
Diana Maria Riva, drama graduate, screen actor
Anne Mason Roberts (1910-1971), HUD official in the 1960s
Michael Robinson, activist for civil right and human rights
Mitch Rowland - Grammy award winning songwriter & lead guitarist in Harry Styles' band
Jerry Rubin, activist
Nipsey Russell, actor, comedian, game show panelist, Tin Man in film version of The Wiz
Rajiv Satyal, comedian, host and speaker; named the university's radio-station-turned-media group "BearCast"
Linda Schele, art and education major, expert on Mayan inscriptions and hieroglyphics
Robert P. Schumaker, creator of AZFinText, a news-aware high-frequency stock prediction system
Jean Schmidt, Congresswoman from Ohio, 2005–13
Teddi Siddall, drama graduate, screen actor 
Abram Simon, rabbi 
Yvette Simpson, law graduate, 2011-2017 Cincinnati City Councilwoman
George Speri Sperti, inventor 
Joseph B. Strauss, engineering graduate, designed Golden Gate Bridge
Thomas Szasz, psychiatrist and author of The Myth of Mental Illness
Bob Taft, law graduate, 1999-2007 Governor of Ohio
William Howard Taft, law graduate, 27th President of the United States, Supreme Court Chief Justice
Christian Tetzlaff, professional violinist
Paul Tibbets, pilot of B-29 plane that dropped atom bomb over Hiroshima
Dwight Tillery, politician, former Mayor of Cincinnati
Tom Tsuchiya, sculptor, works include bronze statues for Great American Ball Park and NFL
Tom Uttech, painter 
Anne Valente, novelist and short-story writer
David Bell, author
Rodney Van Johnson, education graduate, actor (soap opera Passions)
Sigismund von Braun, German diplomat, older brother of Wernher von Braun
David J. Williams, Director of Architecture, musician
Clarence A. Winder, civic leader, Mayor of Pasadena, California in 1950s
Chris Wanstrath, co-founder and former CEO of GitHub
Louis Wolsey, rabbi
George Zepin, rabbi
Martin Zielonka, rabbi
Dylan Mulvaney, actress and social media personality

Athletics

Jim Ard, basketball player for 1976 NBA champion Boston Celtics, sixth overall selection of 1970 NBA draft 
Skeeter Barnes, Major League Baseball player for Cincinnati Reds, Montreal Expos, St. Louis Cardinals and Detroit Tigers
Connor Barwin, NFL defensive end for Los Angeles Rams, selected 2nd round (46th overall) in 2009 NFL Draft
Bob Bell, NFL defensive end for Detroit Lions and St. Louis Cardinals
Corie Blount, basketball player, Chicago Bulls, first round pick in 1993 NBA draft
Ron Bonham, basketball player, 1962 NCAA champion with Cincinnati Bearcats, 2-time NBA champion with Boston Celtics
Vaughn Booker, NFL defensive end for Kansas City Chiefs, Green Bay Packers and Cincinnati Bengals
Ed Brinkman, All-Star baseball player, Washington Senators and Detroit Tigers
Tony Campana, MLB player for Chicago Cubs 
Jim Capuzzi, NFL defensive back and quarterback, played for Green Bay Packers
Brent Celek, NFL tight end for Philadelphia Eagles, selected 5th round (162nd overall) in 2007 NFL Draft, Super Bowl LII Champion
Antonio Chatman, NFL wide receiver, played for Cincinnati Bengals and Green Bay Packers
Trent Cole, NFL defensive end for Philadelphia Eagles 2005-14, selected 5th round (146th overall) in 2005 NFL Draft
Cris Collinsworth, law graduate, Emmy-winning sports commentator, NFL wide receiver
Greg Cook, graduate, NFL quarterback for Cincinnati Bengals
Pat Cummings, NBA player, New York Knicks, Milwaukee Bucks, Dallas Mavericks
Ralph Davis, basketball player, 17th pick of 1960 NBA draft
Zach Day, MLB pitcher 
Connie Dierking, basketball player, fifth overall selection of 1958 NBA draft
 Jacob Eisner (born 1947), Israeli basketball player
Jason Fabini, NFL offensive tackle, New York Jets
Nate Fish, baseball player and coach
Danny Fortson, basketball player, 10th overall pick of 1997 NBA draft
Rich Franklin, professional mixed martial artist, former UFC middleweight champion, V.P. of Asian MMA organization ONE Championship
Yancy Gates (born 1989), basketball player for Ironi Nahariya of Israeli Premier League
Antonio Gibson, USFL NFL safety, Philadelphia Stars and New Orleans Saints
Marcellus Greene, NFL and Canadian Football League player
Tyjuan Hagler, football linebacker for NFL's Indianapolis Colts
Ian Happ, MLB player for Chicago Cubs
Josh Harrison, MLB player for Pittsburgh Pirates
Jim Herman, professional golfer, who plays on the PGA tour, 3 professional wins.
Paul Hogue, basketball player, 2-time NCAA champion with Cincinnati Bearcats, 2nd overall pick of 1962 NBA draft
Candice Holley, basketball player
Jim Holstein, pro basketball player, college head coach
Kevin Huber, NFL punter for Cincinnati Bengals
Miller Huggins, Hall of Fame baseball player and manager; managed champion New York Yankees teams of 1920s
George Jamison, NFL linebacker, played for Detroit Lions
DerMarr Johnson, basketball player
Lewis Johnson, graduate, track & field broadcaster
Ed Jucker, basketball player, coach of Cincinnati Bearcats' 2-time national champions
Rich Karlis, NFL placekicker, played for Denver Broncos
Brendon Kay, football player
Tinker Keck, XFL football player
Jason Kelce, NFL center for Philadelphia Eagles, Super Bowl LII Champion
Travis Kelce, NFL tight end for Kansas City Chiefs, Super Bowl LIV Champion
Sean Kilpatrick (born 1990), NBA player for Chicago Bulls, and for Hapoel Jerusalem of the Israeli Basketball Super League

Sandy Koufax, Hall of Fame baseball pitcher, 4-time World Series champion
Steve Logan, basketball player
Kenyon Martin, basketball player for New York Knicks, top pick in 2000 NBA draft
Jason Maxiell, former NBA power forward, played for Detroit Pistons
Urban Meyer, former head football coach for The Florida Gators, and The Ohio State Buckeyes. Winner of the 2007, and 2009 BCS Championship with Florida as well as the 2014 CFP Championship with Ohio State.
Joe Morrison, NFL running back and wide receiver for New York Giants
Haruki Nakamura, NFL safety for Baltimore Ravens, Carolina Panthers
Elbie Nickel, NFL tight end, played for Pittsburgh Steelers
Ray Nolting, NFL running back, played for Chicago Bears
Jim O'Brien, kicker for Super Bowl V champion Baltimore Colts
Tom O'Malley, NFL quarterback, played for Green Bay Packers
Brig Owens, NFL defensive back, played for Washington Redskins
Ruben Patterson, NBA player, Portland Trail Blazers, Milwaukee Bucks
David Payne, 110m hurdler, 2008 Olympic silver medalist
Tony Pike, NFL quarterback 
Oscar Robertson, Hall of Fame basketball player, NBA champion and MVP
Tom Rossley, former football head coach at SMU, offensive coordinator for Green Bay Packers
Kelly Salchow, former Olympic rower (2004 and 2008 Olympic Games), Women's Quadruple Sculls
Kenny Satterfield, professional basketball player, 2001–12
Kerry Schall, competed on reality show The Ultimate Fighter 2, professional MMA fighter
Lance Stephenson, basketball player for Los Angeles Lakers
Andrew Stewart, football player
Clint Stickdorn, football player
Tom Thacker, basketball player, NCAA and NBA champion, top pick of 1963 NBA draft
Jordan Thompson, Olympic gold medalist volleyball player and member of the United States national team.
Tony Trabert, tennis player, Wimbledon and U.S. Open champion, International Tennis Hall of Fame
Jack Twyman, basketball player, College Basketball Hall of Fame, 6-time NBA All-Star
Nick Van Exel, basketball player, 1998 NBA All-Star
LaDaris Vann, football player
Roland West, basketball player
James White, NBA guard/forward for New York Knicks
Bob Wiesenhahn, basketball player, 1961 NCAA champion with Cincinnati Bearcats, 11th overall pick of 1961 NBA draft
John Williamson (born 1986), basketball player for Hapoel Tel Aviv B.C. of the Israeli Basketball Premier League 
Eric Wilson, football player
Mary Wineberg, 2008 Olympic gold medalist, 4 × 400 m relay
George Winn, NFL running back
Derek Wolfe, NFL defensive end, Baltimore Ravens
D. J. Woods, Canadian Football League wide receiver, Ottawa Redblacks
Mike Woods, All-American and NFL player
Tony Yates, basketball player for two-time national champion Cincinnati Bearcats, head coach 1983-89

Kevin Youkilis, 3-time All-Star, Gold Glove winner, 2-time World Series champion, MLB player 2004-13
Curtis Young, NFL defensive end, Green Bay Packers

Notable faculty
Neil Armstrong (until death), astronaut, professor of aerospace engineering
Kamala Balakrishnan, immunologist, professor of transplantation medicine
Carl Blegen, first scientific explorer of Troy
Tanya Froehlich, pediatrician
 Karen L. Gould (born 1948), President of Brooklyn College
Michael Griffith, author
Kay Kinoshita, physicist
Santa Ono, biomedical scientist, 28th President of University of Cincinnati, 15th President of University of British Columbia, 15th President of the University of Michigan
Neil Rackham, author of Spin Selling
George Rieveschl, inventor of diphenhydramine (Benadryl)
Albert Sabin, developed the oral live polio vaccine
Vernon L. Scarborough, Mesoamerican archaeologist, professor, and anthropology department head
Herman Schnieder, father of co-operative education
Donald Shell, inventor of Shell sort
Amy Townsend-Small, Director of the Environmental Studies Program
Carol Tyler, cartoonist
Gabriel P. Weisberg, art historian

References

UC Magazine on Famous Alumni

University of Cincinnati people
University of Cincinnati